Royal Clipper is a steel-hulled five-masted fully rigged tall ship used as a cruise ship. She was redesigned by Robert McFarlane of McFarlane ShipDesign, for Star Clippers Ltd. of Sweden, the same designer behind the cruise company's first two vessels. This third one was built using an existing steel hull designed by Zygmunt Choreń that was modified by the Gdańsk Shipyard, where  was added to its length.

Originally built by Polish communist authorities as "Gwarek" she was intended as a floating vacation home for miners. She was sold because of financial problems. The Merwede shipyard completed the ship's interior in July 2000, whilst visiting the Pool of London, for its pre-launch to the travel industry. The renovations included frescography murals by Rainer Maria Latzke completing the ship's Mediterranean interior. Her design was based on Preussen, a famous German five-mast Flying P-Liner windjammer built in 1902.

Star Clippers claims that she is the largest "true sailing ship" built since Preussen. Her sails can be handled with a crew as small as twenty using powered controls.

Royal Clipper cruises the Mediterranean during the summer. During the winter she offers Caribbean trips through the southern parts of the Lesser Antilles area. Because of her size, she can visit smaller ports that larger (motor) cruise ships can't reach. Transatlantic crossings are available between seasons.

Gallery

See also

 Star Clipper
 Star Flyer
 Flying Clipper
 List of cruise ships
 List of large sailing vessels

References

External links

 Star Clippers website about Royal Clipper
 "Royal Clipper: melding the thrills of sailing with the comforts of cruising aboard Star Clippers' mega-yacht" by Charles Doherty, Cruise Travel (magazine/journal), September 2005, as found online at LookSmart Find Articles
 "Royal Clipper" – review by Douglas Ward in The Daily Telegraph, London
 "ROYAL CLIPPER To The Grenadines, Part One", "Part Two" and "Part Three" – review by Peter Knego in Maritime Matters
 "Setting Sail" – review of Royal Clipper in Cruise Passenger.

Cruise ships
Five-masted ships
Windjammers
Ships built in Poland
Tall ships
Tall ships of Luxembourg
Tall ships of Poland
Full-rigged ships
2000 ships